Zahera Darabid (born May 10, 1980), known by her stage name Zaho, is an Algerian-Canadian R&B singer.

Biography
Zahera Darabid was born on May 10, 1980, in Bab Ezzouar, a suburb of the Algerian capital Algiers. At the age of 18, she and her family moved to Montréal, Canada. Her father is an executive and her mother a mathematics professor at l'Institut national d'informatique of France. She has a brother and sister.

Career
Zaho learned the guitar when she was seven years old, and very quickly learned the répertoire of Francis Cabrel within 10 years. In 1999, when she emigrated to Montreal, she discovered the world of professional music with its producers and its studios. She was seen with notable names in the French industry such as Idir, Tunisiano and Soprano.

In 2008, she released her debut album titled Dima, meaning Always in Arabic.

Zaho also has a strong writing background, writing the song "Tout ce temps" for Idir. Upon hearing the song, Idir insisted that she sang the song along with him.

In 2008, Zaho represented France in the 2008 MTV EMA's and won the Best European Artist award. She is well known in France and French Canada, and a lot of other places.

Discography

Albums

Mixtapes
Zaho: La Mixtape (2007)

Singles

*Did not appear in the official Belgian Ultratop 50 charts, but rather in the bubbling under Ultratip charts.

Other charting songs

Featured in

*Did not appear in the official Belgian Ultratop 50 charts, but rather in the bubbling under Ultratip charts.

Also featured in
 "Basta" by La Fouine, in "Bourré au son" (2005)
 "Halili" by Cheb Mami, in "Layali" (2006)
 "Un point c tout" by Sefyu, in "Qui suis-je?" (with Mina and Sana) (2006)
 "Lune de miel" by Don Choa, in "Jungle de béton" (2007)
 "Tout ce temps" by Idir, in "La France des couleurs" (2007)
 "La France des couleurs" by Idir, dans "La France des couleurs"
 "Citoyen du monde" by Tunisiano, in "Le Regard des gens" (2008)
 "Je m'écris" by Kery James, in "À l'ombre du show business" (with also Grand Corps Malade) (2008)
 "Quand ils vont partir" by Kamelancien, in "Le Frisson de la vérité"
 "T'est chelou", remix by "C'est chelou", by D.Dy in "T'aimes ou t'aimes pas" (2008)
 "Hold My Hand" (French Version), by Sean Paul (2010)
 "Heartless" by Justin Nozuka (2010)
 "Fais doucement" by Rohff, in "La cuenta" (2010)
 "Elle venait du ciel" by La Fouine in "La fouine vs laouni" (2011)
 "Indélébile" -Christophe Willem ft. Zaho (2011)
 "Ma Meilleure" – La Fouine feat Zaho (2013)
 "Shooting Star" – Tara McDonald feat Zaho (2013)
 "Du rêve" - TK feat Zaho (2020)

Awards and nominations

 MTV Europe Music Awards 2008 : Meilleur artiste français
 NRJ Music Awards 2009 : Révélation francophone de l'année
 NRJ Music Awards 2011 : Groupe/Duo/Troupe francophone de l'année feat Justin Nozuka
 Prix de La Création 2011: Chanson international 2011 feat Sean Paul
 Trace Urban Music Award 2013 : Meilleure artiste féminine
 Trace Urban Music Awards 2013 : Meilleure collaboration feat La Fouine

References

External links
Zaho Official web site 

1980 births
Living people
Algerian emigrants to Canada
Canadian contemporary R&B singers
French-language singers of Canada
People from Algiers Province
21st-century Canadian women singers
MTV Europe Music Award winners
21st-century Algerian women singers